Consort Wang (Chinese: 王德妃, pinyin: Wáng) was a consort of the Song Dynasty's second emperor, Emperor Taizong of Song.

Biography
Emperor and Wang had the son, Zhao Yuanyan, called the “Eighth Prince” (born 986). At the time of the prince’s birth, Emperor’s wife was Empress Li, considered the “official mother” of the Prince. Emperor and his other consort, Lady Li, had son Zhao Heng, who succeeded his father in 997 as Emperor Zhenzong.

When Wang became ill, she was served by her son personally, who thus showed filial piety.

Ranks

Lady Wang was first titled the Lady of Jincheng County (金城郡君) by Emperor Taizong. After she gave birth to the Eighth Prince she was promoted to the title of Beauty Meiren (美人). Eventually she became Jieyu (婕妤). Consort Wang rose up the ranks and became Zhaoyuan (昭媛), the 12th rank concubine. After she died, she was titled the Virtuous Consort  (德妃) and months later  (淑妃).

References

Chinese concubines
Song dynasty people